The 2013 Pro Mazda Championship was the 15th season in series history and first under new promoter Andersen Promotions.

Andretti Autosport driver Matthew Brabham won the championship with two races remaining capturing a series-record 11th win in his rookie season. Brabham's championship secured a scholarship to compete in Indy Lights in 2014. Brabham won 13 of the season's 16 races, shattering the series record. Juncos Racing's Diego Ferreira won the season opener and finished second in points with eleven podium finishes. Brabham's Andretti Autosport teammate Shelby Blackstock won a single race and two poles and finished third in points. Team Pelfrey's Spencer Pigot also won a single race and finished fourth in points.

Andretti Autosport also captured the team championship with two races remaining, their first in Pro Mazda.

There were no full-time Expert class participants (a class for drivers age 35 and older). American Jay Horak won the championship with eight race starts by a narrow margin over Bobby Eberle, who also completed a partial schedule.

While only nine drivers competed in all sixteen rounds of the championship, 27 different drivers made appearances in a Pro Mazda car over the course of the season.

Drivers and teams
All teams were American-registered.

Race calendar and results

Championship standings

Drivers'

 Drivers must complete 50% race distance to score main points, otherwise 1 point is awarded.
 1: Jay Horak was not registered for the championship at Austin.

Teams'

References

External links
 Star Mazda Championship Official website 

Pro Mazda Championship
Indy Pro 2000 Championship